In Greek mythology, Achaeus or Achaios (Ancient Greek: Ἀχαιός Akhaiós means 'griever', derived from αχος achos, 'grief, pain, woe') was the eponym of Achaea.

Family 
Achaeus was the son of Poseidon, the god of the sea and Larissa, daughter of Pelasgus, the son of Triopas, meaning he is of Argive descent through his mother's parentage. He is the brother of Phthius and Pelasgus.

Mythology 
Together with his brothers Phthius and Pelasgus, they left Achaean Argos with a Pelasgian contingent for Thessaly. They then established a colony on the said country naming it after themselves. The only source of the accounts of Achaeus is recounted by Dionysius of Halicarnassus in his Roman Antiquities about the Pelasgian race's migration in connection with Achaeus.

 "In the sixth generation afterwards, leaving the Peloponnesus, they [Pelasgians] removed to the country which was then called Haemonia and now Thessaly. The leaders of the colony were Achaeus, Phthius and Pelasgus, the sons of Larisa and Poseidon. When they arrived in Haemonia they drove out the barbarian inhabitants and divided the country into three parts, calling them, after the names of their leaders, Phthiotis, Achaia and Pelasgiotis."

Note

References 

 Dionysus of Halicarnassus, Roman Antiquities. English translation by Earnest Cary in the Loeb Classical Library, 7 volumes. Harvard University Press, 1937–1950. Online version at Bill Thayer's Web Site
 Dionysius of Halicarnassus, Antiquitatum Romanarum quae supersunt, Vol I-IV. . Karl Jacoby. In Aedibus B.G. Teubneri. Leipzig. 1885. Greek text available at the Perseus Digital Library.

Inachids
Children of Poseidon
Demigods in classical mythology
Mythology of Achaea